Andrew Stehlin is a New Zealand actor and stuntman. He started his career as a set builder and stunt performer but found a way to combine his interest in acting with his stuntwork and became a part-time actor. He received a minor cult following after playing the vicious vampire beta male Arvin in the horror film 30 Days of Night (2007). In 2019, Stehlin portrayed the X-Men mutant Ariki in Dark Phoenix (2019).

Career
He started his career as a hairdresser and had appeared on Hercules: The Legendary Journeys and Xena: Warrior Princess as an extra. Stehlin was attracted to the stunt roles and opted to pursue a career as a stunt man due to having a martial arts background. He was contacted by a friend to help form a stunt team for The Lord of the Rings: The Fellowship of the Ring because the original team was ironically working on the shows that Stehlin was an extra on.

Filmography

Stunts

The Lord of the Rings: The Fellowship of the Ring
The Lord of the Rings: The Two Towers
King Kong
10,000 BC
Underworld: Rise of the Lycans
The Warrior's Way
Spartacus: Blood and Sand
Spartacus: Vengeance
Spartacus: War of the Damned
The Hobbit: The Battle of the Five Armies
Ghost in the Shell (2017)
Dark Phoenix (2019)

Actor

References

External links

New Zealand male film actors
New Zealand stunt performers
Living people
Year of birth missing (living people)